Dust is the third studio album by heavy metal band Tremonti. It was released on April 29, 2016 via FRET12 records. Dust was recorded during the same time that Cauterize was being recorded. The record was produced by Michael "Elvis" Baskette, who produced Tremonti's past two records and also produced Alter Bridge's records.

Track listing

Personnel
Tremonti
 Mark Tremonti – lead vocals, lead guitar, arrangement
 Eric Friedman – rhythm guitar, backing vocals, arrangement
 Garrett Whitlock – drums, arrangement
 Wolfgang Van Halen – bass, backing vocals, arrangement

Production
 Michael "Elvis" Baskette – producer, mixing, arrangement
 Jef Moll – engineer
 Ted Jensen – mastering

Charts

References

Mark Tremonti albums
Albums produced by Michael Baskette
2016 albums